The 2013–14 ISU World Standings and Season's World Ranking, are the World Standings and Season's World Ranking published by the International Skating Union (ISU) during the 2013–14 season.

The 2013–14 ISU World Standings for single & pair skating and ice dance, are taking into account results of the 2011–12, 2012–13 and 2013–14 seasons.

The 2013–14 ISU Season's World Ranking is based on the results of the 2013–14 season only.

The 2013–14 ISU World standings for synchronized skating, are based on the results of the 2011–12, 2012–13 and 2013–14 seasons.

World Standings for single & pair skating and ice dance

Season-end standings 
The remainder of this section is a complete list, by discipline, published by the ISU.

Men's singles (184 skaters)

Ladies' singles (234 skaters)

Pairs (88 couples)

Ice dance (136 couples)

Season's World Ranking 
The remainder of this section is a complete list, by discipline, published by the ISU.

Men's singles (135 skaters)

Ladies' singles (149 skaters)

Pairs (72 couples)

Ice dance (101 couples)

World standings for synchronized skating

See also 
 ISU World Standings and Season's World Ranking
 List of highest ranked figure skaters by nation
 List of ISU World Standings and Season's World Ranking statistics
 2013–14 figure skating season
 2013–14 synchronized skating season

References

External links 
 International Skating Union
 ISU World standings for Single & Pair Skating and Ice Dance / ISU Season's World Ranking
 ISU World standings for Synchronized Skating

ISU World Standings and Season's World Ranking
Standings and Ranking
Standings and Ranking